Brian Edward Fallon Jr. (born c. 1982) is an American political activist. He was the national press secretary for Hillary Clinton's 2016 presidential campaign, a role he began in March 2015.

Career
Fallon graduated cum laude from Harvard, where he covered sports for The Harvard Crimson. During the 2004 presidential election, Fallon worked on the Kerry–Edwards presidential campaign as a press aide. During the 2006 Senate election in New Jersey, Fallon served as campaign press secretary to Senator Robert Menendez. Fallon then became chief spokesman for Senator Chuck Schumer of New York, and in 2011 additionally became spokesman for the new Senate Democratic Policy and Communications Center. In 2013, Fallon left Schumer's office and moved to the Justice Department, with Attorney General Eric Holder hiring him as the department's director of public affairs.

Fallon joined Hillary Clinton's 2016 presidential campaign in March 2015, as national press secretary. Fallon famously tweeted "Georgia is on our mind" in September 2016, referring to the possibility of Clinton turning the Peach State blue. This prediction never materialized and Clinton went on to lose the state by five points to Donald Trump.

In February 2017, he joined CNN as a political commentator, based in Washington, D.C. In October 2017, he caused controversy by tweeting [General] "Kelly isnt just an enabler of Trump. He's a believer in him. That makes him as odious as the rest. Dont be distracted by the uniform." At its founding in May 2018, Fallon became executive director of Demand Justice, a 501(c)(4) advocacy organization. In the first Demand Justice report card, Fallon gave Senator Chuck Schumer, his former boss, a "C" rating. This damaged his relationship with Schumer. When asked about his relationship with Schumer, whom he does not directly criticize, Fallon declined to "answer any questions about Chuck."

Personal life
Fallon is married to Katie Beirne Fallon, the former White House Director of Legislative Affairs and head of the White House Office of Legislative Affairs for the administration of U.S. President Barack Obama.

References

American press secretaries
Living people
Hillary Clinton 2016 presidential campaign
John Kerry 2004 presidential campaign
People associated with the 2004 United States presidential election
People associated with the 2016 United States presidential election
The Harvard Crimson people
Year of birth missing (living people)